Edelweiss Pianos is a British piano company, founded in 1975 in Cambridge, UK, as 1066 Pianos by research physicist and pianist John Roy Norman.

History
Founder Roy Norman, a research physicist at Cambridge University, originally tuned pianos as a hobby. When he saw the lack of quality piano restorations, he started tuning pianos himself and soon found himself restoring and reselling his first piano from his living-room. From the money he made he bought two pianos which he restored and resold. He opened a small shop in Cambridge, and the company was named 1066 Pianos. The company's workshop and headquarters is now located in the village of Fulbourn, just outside Cambridge.

Expansion
In 2008, the Edelweiss brand was born and Roy's son Mark Norman became the head of design and began introducing futuristic designs that distinguished Edelweiss from other piano companies as well as offering pianos that were totally bespoke.

Models
Edelweiss pianos are sold through the Cambridge headquarters and through Harrods, and come by default as player pianos.

Grands and uprights
The Edelweiss workshop in Cambridge makes the following four models of grand pianos, of which the smallest two are baby grands, and two models of upright piano (The numerical portion of the model designations represent the length of the grand pianos and the height of the upright pianos in inches):

Baby grand pianos: G52, G62, G66, Transparent G66
Grand piano: G75
Upright pianos: U46, U52, Transparent U49

Special designs

Inventive designs and colour combinations have been a part of Edelweiss from the very beginning. Since each piano offered can be totally bespoke, the possibilities are virtually endless. Through a number of collaborations with designers and hotels, Edelweiss have positioned themselves as one of the top piano makers in the world.

Player pianos
In 2016, Edelweiss introduced their own player pianos with full audio. The company's fast growth led luxury department store Harrods to invite Edelweiss to their furniture department in 2017, four years after Harrods' original piano department had been shut down.

In 2018, Edelweiss Pianos were featured on the YouTube channel of the Financial Times, and said to be "regarded as the most upmarket of today's breed of the self-playing piano".

In March 2022, a modified version of an Edelweiss piano that was modified to play itself using a solenoid was featured on Mark Rober's YouTube channel, where he also used it to attempt to play Rush E by Sheet Music Boss, which is well known as a song that is genuinely impossible to play by one person.

See also
 Player pianos

References

External links
 Edelweiss Pianos - Official Website

British brands
Companies based in Cambridge
British companies established in 1975
English brands
Luxury brands
Manufacturing companies established in 1975
Musical instrument manufacturing companies of the United Kingdom
1975 establishments in England